Ardahan (Russian: Ардаган) is a city in northeastern Turkey, near the Georgian border. It is the seat of Ardahan Province and Ardahan District. Its population is 22,927 (2021).

History

Ancient and medieval
Ardahan was historically located in the region of Gogarene (Gugark), which Strabo calls a part of the Armenia that was taken away from the Kingdom of Iberia. In the Middle Ages Ardahan served as an important transit point for goods arriving from the Abbasid Caliphate and departing to the regions around the Black Sea. During the 8th to 10th centuries the region was in hands of the Bagrationi princes of Tao-Klarjeti under the name of Artaani, and later part of Kingdom of Georgia between 11th to 15th centuries. According to the Arab historian Yahya of Antioch, the Byzantines razed Ardahan and slaughtered its population in 1021.

The Mongols took hold of the city in the 1230s but the Georgian princes of Samtskhe were able to recapture it in 1266. In 1555, by the Peace of Amasya, the western part of the principality of Samtskhe was annexed by the Ottoman Empire, and Ardahan was included into the sanjak of Ardahan (an overall part of the vilayet of Akhaltsikhe). The Ottomans turned Ardahan into a formidable  fortress-town. In the 1640s the Ottoman traveler Evliya Çelebi visited Ardahan and gave the following description: "The fortress of Ardahan sits atop an inaccessible cliff. It is square-shaped and sturdy... This fortress has a cold climate and, because of this, there are no gardens or orchards. Fruits arrive from the fortress at Ajara and Tortum."

Modern

Before 1829 Ardahan was recorded to have had 400 households, the majority of them Armenian. Many of them later emigrated to the Russian Empire in the early 19th century. During the Russo-Turkish War (1828–1829) it was an important road junction connecting the border fortress of Akhaltsikhe to the Kars-Erzerum road. The town passed into the hands of Russia following the 1877-1878 Russo-Turkish War and was made a part of the Ardahan Okrug of the Kars Oblast. The majority of the town was made up of Armenians, while other ethnic groups included Georgians, Pontic Greeks (here usually called Caucasus Greeks), Caucasus Jews, Russians, Kurds, Ossetians, and Yazidis. A Polish community was also established, with the majority of Poles being sent to Ardahan from the Russian Partition of Poland after being conscripted to the Russian Army. The town flourished economically under Russian rule, exporting fruits, smoked lamb meat, wheat and wood. New roads were constructed, linking Ardahan to Akhalkalak, Kars, and Oltu. On 25 December 1914, in the early months of the First World War, the Ottoman Army occupied Ardahan and massacred many of its Armenians, Pontic Greeks, and Georgians. The Russians, with the help of Armenian and Pontic Greek militias, captured the town on January 3, 1915, allowing some of the original inhabitants who had fled to return.

As Russian forces withdrew from the front following the October Revolution, a small Armenian volunteer force took up positions to defend the town from the approaching Ottoman Army. On March 6, 1918, the Ottoman army, along with the help of the town's Muslims, overwhelmed Ardahan's Armenian garrison and retook the town. The British occupied Ardahan after the end of the First World War and eventually handed control over it to the Democratic Republic of Armenia. When the Turkish Nationalists captured Ardahan in November 1920, the town's remaining Armenians, Pontic Greeks, and Georgians fled to Armenia, northern Greece, and Georgia. The Treaty of Moscow, signed the following year between the Soviets and the Ankara Government, confirmed Ardahan as a part of Turkish territory.

In 1986 a brief description of the fortress was published.  The original late antique/medieval walls of Ardahan Kalesi were extensively rebuilt several times and in the 19th they were adapted to accommodate small cannons.

In 1960, Ardahan's population stood at 7,228 and was populated by both Kurds and Turks.

According to a 2021 poll, approximately half the population was of Turkish and the other half was of Kurdish origin.

Demographics

Geography 
Ardahan is situated in northeastern Turkey, close to the border with Georgia. It lies on the upper course of the river Kura, south of the Yalnızçam Mountains. The town consists of 7 quarters: Halilefendi, Karagöl, Kaptanpaşa, Yenimahalle, Gürçayir, Atatürk and Inönü.

Climate 
Ardahan has a humid continental climate (Köppen: Dfb, Trewartha: Dc), bordering on an alpine subarctic (Köppen: Dfc, Trewartha: Ec) climate on higher elevations, with brief, mild summers and very cold winters.

Summers are mild to warm during daytime, but turn colder nocturnally. Because of this, temperatures below freezing have been recorded every month of the year. It is also frequently rainy most of the year, especially in spring and summer.

Winters are quite snowy with snow cover lasting from late October to mid April. Although it does snow in September and May, accumulating snowfall is rare. On rarer occasions, it has also snowed in summer months, such as the snowfall in August 2013.  The highest recorded snow thickness was 113 cm (44.5 inches) on 30 January 1968.

International relations

Twin towns—Sister cities
Ardahan is twinned with:
 Akhaltsikhe, Georgia
 Grozny, Russia

Notable locals 

 See Category:People from Ardahan

References

External links
 info

Further reading

 Kyureghyan, Levon. Կարս և Արտահան (Kars and Artahan). Vienna: Mkhitarian Press, 1949.
 Yeremyan, Suren T. Հայաստանը ըստ «Աշխարհացույցի» (Armenia According to the Ashkharatsuyts). Yerevan: Armenian Academy of Sciences, 1963.

 
Populated places in Ardahan Province
Tao-Klarjeti
Ardahan District
Towns in Turkey
Kars Oblast